The following are international rankings of .

Demographics

Health

Society

Education

Economy

Globalization and Innovation

Politics

Communication and Information Technology

Environment

References

Military of Georgia (country)
Culture of Georgia (country)
Politics of Georgia (country)
Demographics of Georgia (country)
Economy of Georgia (country)
Environment of Georgia (country)
Georgia